François Henri de Montmorency-Bouteville, Duke of Piney-Luxembourg, commonly known as Luxembourg (8 January 1628 – 4 January 1695), and nicknamed "The Upholsterer of Notre-Dame" (Le Tapissier de Notre-Dame), was a French general and Marshal of France. A comrade and successor of the Great Condé, he was one of the most accomplished military commanders of the early modern period and is particularly noted for his exploits in the Franco-Dutch War and War of the Grand Alliance. Not imposing physically, as he was a slight man and hunchbacked, Luxembourg was nonetheless one of France's greatest generals. He never lost a battle in which he held command.

Early years
François Henri de Montmorency was born in Paris. His father, the François de Montmorency-Bouteville, had been executed six months before his birth for participating in a duel against the Marquis de Beuvron. His aunt, Charlotte Marguerite de Montmorency, Princess of Condé, took charge of him and educated him with her son, the Duke of Enghien. The young Montmorency (or Bouteville as he was then called) attached himself to his cousin, and shared his successes and reverses throughout the troubles of the Fronde. He returned to France in 1659 and was pardoned, and Condé, then much attached to the Duchess of Châtillon, Montmorency's sister, contrived the marriage of his adherent and cousin to the greatest heiress in France, Madeleine de Luxembourg, Princess of Tingry and heiress of the Luxembourg dukedom (1661), after which he was created Duke of Luxembourg and peer of France.

Luxembourg as general

War of Devolution and the Franco-Dutch War
At the opening of the War of Devolution (1667–68), Condé, and consequently Luxembourg, had no command, but during the second campaign he served as Condé's lieutenant general in the conquest of Franche-Comté. During the four years of peace which followed, Luxembourg cultivated the favour of Louvois, and in 1672 held a high command against the Dutch during the Franco-Dutch War (1672–1678). He defeated a counterattack by the Prince William III of Orange at Woerden but was blocked by the Dutch Water Line. On 27 December the inundations were frozen over and he began to cross over the ice, but a sudden thaw cut his force in half. Retreating, de Luxembourg found the fortress town of Bodegraven abandoned by its garrison and ordered the entire civilian population to be burned alive with their houses. The Dutch anti-French propaganda quickly exploited this massacre and when de Luxembourg bragged to Louis XIV that he had roasted any Dutchman he could find in the town, he was surprised to find that some at court considered such cruelties unnecessary. In 1673 he made his famous retreat from Utrecht to Maastricht with only 20,000 men in face of 70,000, an exploit which placed him in the first rank of generals. In 1674 he was made captain of the Garde du Corps, and in 1675 Marshal of France.

On 10 March 1676 (N.S.) he was made commander of the Army of the Rhine replacing Condé, who was in bad health. However, he could not relieve the siege of Philippsburg. This fortress had been invested by Imperial troops under Charles V, Duke of Lorraine on 1 May. Luxembourg could neither break through the defenses of Wissembourg established by the Imperials, nor draw them out to do battle. Philippsburg fell on 17 September. In 1677 he stormed Valenciennes, defeated William of Orange again at Cassel and in 1678, repulsed another of his assault at Saint-Denis after the signature of the Peace of Nijmegen. His reputation was now high and it is reputed that he quarrelled with Louvois, who managed to involve him in the "Affair of the Poisons" and get him sent to the Bastille. Rousset in his Histoire de Louvois has shown that this quarrel is probably apocryphal. Luxembourg doubtlessly spent some months of 1680 in the Bastille, but on his release took up his post at court as capitaine des gardes.

War of the Grand Alliance 1688-97
By 1690, during the War of the Grand Alliance, Luxembourg was entrusted with the command of King Louis' army in the Spanish Netherlands, superseding Louis de Crevant, Duke of Humières. On 1 July 1690, he won his greatest victory over William's allied commander, the Prince of Waldeck, at Fleurus. In the following year he was again victorious at Leuze on 18 September 1691.

In the next campaign he covered the king's 1692 Siege of Namur, and defeated William at Steenkerque in 1692; and again on 29 July 1693, won the most famous of his battles over his eternal adversary at Neerwinden, after which he was called "Le Tapissier de Nôtre Dame" (The Upholsterer of Notre Dame) due to the number of captured enemy flags that he sent to the cathedral. He was received with enthusiasm at Paris by all but the king, who looked coldly on a relative and adherent of the Condés. St-Simon describes in the first volume of his Memoirs how, instead of ranking as eighteenth peer of France according to his patent of 1661, he claimed through his wife to be duc de Piney of an old creation of 1571, which would place him second on the roll. The affair is described with St-Simon's usual interest in the peerage, and was chiefly checked through his assiduity.

In the campaign of 1694, Luxembourg did little in Flanders, except conducting a famous march from Vignemont to Tournai in face of the enemy.

Death
On his return to Versailles for the winter he fell ill, and died. In his last moments he was attended by the famous Jesuit priest Bourdaloue, who said on his death, "I have not lived his life, but I would wish to die his death." Luxembourg was considered immoral, even in those times, but as a general he was Condé's grandest pupil. Though slothful like Condé in the management of a campaign, at the moment of battle he seemed seized with happy inspirations, against which no ardour of William's and no steadiness of Dutch or English soldiers could stand. His death and Catinat's disgrace close the second period of the military history of the reign of Louis XIV.

Reputation
St-Simon said of Luxembourg:
...in his final calculations no one was ever more conscientious than M. de Luxembourg; no one more brilliant, prudent and far-sighted in the face of the enemy or in battle. He had daring and confidence, and at the same time a cool-headedness that allowed him to observe and foresee in the midst of the fiercest cannonade, in dangerously critical moments. That was when he was truly great. At all other times he was idleness itself; no exercise, except where absolutely necessary; gambling; conversing with intimates; every night a small supper party; nearly always with the same company, and, if they happened to be near a town, an agreeable mingling of the sexes.
He was distinguished for a pungent wit. One of his retorts referred to his deformity. "I never can beat that cursed humpback", William was reputed to have said of him. "How does he know I have a hump?" retorted Luxembourg, "he has never seen my back." He left four sons, the youngest of whom was a marshal of France as Marechal de Montmorency.

Marriage and children

On 17 March 1661 François-Henri de Montmorency married Madeleine de Clermont-Tonnerre, duchess of Luxembourg, princess of Tingry, comtess of Ligny, baroness of Dangu, and had 5 children:

 Charles Frédéric de Montmorency-Luxembourg (1662–1726), duc de Piney-Luxembourg, father of Charles II Frédéric (1702–1764) Marshal of France (1757) ;
 Pierre Henri de Montmorency-Luxembourg (1663–1700), abbot of Saint-Michel d'Orcamp ;
 Paul Sigismond de Montmorency-Luxembourg (1664-?), duc de Châtillon, comte de Luxe and baron d'Apremont ;
 Angelique Cunegonde de Montmorency-Luxembourg (1666–1736), mademoiselle de Luxembourg ; married Louis Henri de Bourbon, bâtard de Soissons, illegitimate son of Louis de Bourbon and had issue; had two children;
 Christian Louis de Montmorency-Luxembourg (1675–1746), prince de Tingry, comte de Luxe, pair de France, Marshal of France (1734).

 Citations 

 References 

 
 Beaurain's Histoire militaire du duc de Luxembourg (Hague and Paris, 1756)
  – Monteq to Riva
 Desormeaux's Histoire de la maison de Montmorency (1764), vols. iv. and v.
 Camille Rousset's Louvois''
 biography of Luxemburg by Count de Segur (1907)
  – 1691 to 1709
  – 1628 to 1668
 

1628 births
1695 deaths
1680 crimes
17th-century peers of France
Affair of the Poisons
Dukes of Piney
French military personnel of the Franco-Dutch War
French military personnel of the Nine Years' War
Francois Henri
Marshals of France
Military personnel from Paris
Nobility from Paris
Prisoners of the Bastille